The Georgia Army National Guard is the Army National Guard component of the Georgia National Guard, administratively part of the Georgia Department of Defense. It consists of more than 11,100 citizen-soldiers training in more than 79 hometown armories and regional facilities across the state. Georgia’s Army Guard is the sixth largest in the nation and includes combat, combat support and combat service support units.

When activated under Title 10, the Georgia Army National Guard is a component of the United States Army and is absorbed into the National Guard of the United States. Nationwide, the Army National Guard comprises approximately one half of the US Army's available combat forces and approximately one third of its support organization. National coordination of various state National Guard units are maintained through the National Guard Bureau. When activated under Title 32, the Georgia Army National Guard remains under state command as it fulfills a federally assigned mission.

Units

48th Infantry Brigade Combat Team (48th IBCT) consisting of:
Headquarters 48th IBCT
1st Squadron, 108th Cavalry Regiment
1st Battalion, 121st Infantry
2nd Battalion, 121st Infantry
3rd Battalion, 121st Infantry
1st Battalion, 118th Field Artillery Regiment (1-118th FAR)
148th Brigade Support Battalion (148th BSB)
177th Brigade Engineer Battalion (177th BEB)
648th Maneuver Enhancement Brigade (648th MEB) consisting of
Headquarters and Headquarters Company (HHC), 648th MEB
620th Signal Company (Detached to West Virginia Army National Guard)
348th Brigade Support Battalion (348th BSB) consisting of
Headquarters and Headquarters Company (HHC), 348th BSB
Company A, 348th BSB
Company B, 348th BSB
1160th Transportation Company
878th Engineer Combat Battalion (878th ECB) (Heavy)consisting of
Headquarters and Support Company (HSC), 878th ECB
Forward Support Company (FSC), 878th ECB
876th Engineering Company
810th Engineering Company
848th Engineering Company
175th Engineering Detachment
874th Engineering Detachment
1048th Engineering Detachment
1st Battalion, 214th Field Artillery Regiment (1-214th FAR) consisting of
Headquarters and Headquarters Battery (HHB), 1-214th FAR
A Battery, 1-214th FAR
B Battery, 1-214th FAR
C Battery, 1-214th FAR
1214th Forward Support Company (1214th FSC)
116th Army Band
118th Public Service Detachment (118th PSD)
185th Aviation Regiment (part of the unit was activated in July 2006 for training; in November 2006 that unit was deployed to Kosovo as a part of Task Force Eagle)
560th Battlefield Surveillance Brigade (560th BFSB) - Inactive
221st Military Intelligence Battalion (221st MIB)-(Tactical Exploitation)
3rd Squadron Reconnaissance & Surveillance (R&S), 108th Cavalry Regiment
Headquarters and Headquarters Troop (HHT), 3-108th Cavalry
Troop A, 3-108th Cavalry
Troop B, 3-108th Cavalry
Troop C (LRS), 3-108th Cavalry (formerly Company H (LRS), 121st Infantry Regiment)
420th Network Signal Company (420th NSC)
230th Brigade Support Company (230th BSC)
82nd Maintenance Company
124th Mobile Public Affairs Detachment (124th MPAD)
1st Battalion, 54th Security Force Assistance Brigade

Duties
National Guard units can be mobilized at any time by presidential order to supplement regular armed forces, and upon declaration of a state of emergency by the governor of the state in which they serve. Unlike Army Reserve members, National Guard members cannot be mobilized individually (except through voluntary transfers and Temporary Duty Assignments TDY), but only as part of their respective units. However, there has been a significant number of individual activations to support military operations.

Active duty call-ups
For much of the final decades of the twentieth century, National Guard personnel typically served "one weekend a month, two weeks a year", with a portion working for the Guard in a full-time capacity. The current forces formation plans of the US Army call for the typical National Guard unit (or national guardsman) to serve one year of active duty for every three years of service. More specifically, current Department of Defense policy is that no guardsman will be involuntarily activated for a total of more than 24 months (cumulative) in one six-year enlistment period (this policy is due to change 1 August 2007, the new policy states that soldiers will be given 24 months between deployments of no more than 24 months, individual states have differing policies).

History
The Georgia Army National Guard was originally formed in 1751. The 118th Field Artillery (GA ARNG), which traces its lineage to militia units from Savannah and surrounding Chatham County that served in the War of 1812, is one of only nineteen Army National Guard units with campaign credit for the War of 1812.

The Militia Act of 1903 organized the various U.S. state militias into the present National Guard system. The 121st and 122nd Infantry Regiments, formed from existing Georgia state regiments, formed the 61st Infantry Brigade of the 31st Dixie Division mobilized for World War I. The two regiments served with that brigade from August 1917 to November 1918.

After World War II, the 48th Infantry Division was organized in the state, but on 1 November 1955, was reorganized as the 48th Armored Division. The division was commanded before and immediately after its change of name by Maj. Gen. Joseph B. Fraser of Hinesville. The new armored division’s authorized strength was 7,727, a drop of more than 2,000 from the Infantry Division; however a non-divisional group of more than 2,000 was also formed during the 1955 reorganization and re-designation of Georgia’s Army Guard units. The 48th Armored Division was disbanded on 1 January 1968.

The 118th Field Artillery was broken up on 1 January 1968 and its elements reorganized and were redesignated, with Headquarters, Headquarters and Service Battery, 1st Battalion, consolidated with Headquarters and Headquarters Battery, 48th Armored Division Artillery, and the consolidated unit reorganized and was redesignated as Headquarters and Headquarters Battery, 118th Artillery Group. It was redesignated on 9 May 1978 as Headquarters and Headquarters Battery, 118th Field Artillery Brigade.

In 1984-85, the 118th Field Artillery Brigade was headquartered at Savannah and comprised the 1st and 2nd Battalions of the 214th Field Artillery, both using 155-mm towed artillery pieces. In the late 1980s the 171st Aviation Regiment was formed in the state.

References

External links
Bibliography of Georgia Army National Guard History  compiled by the United States Army Center of Military History
Georgia Army National Guard, accessed 20 November 2006
GlobalSecurity.org Georgia Army National Guard, accessed 20 November 2006

United States Army National Guard by state
Military in Georgia (U.S. state)